Mulligatawny is a soup which originated from South Indian cuisine. It is related to the dish .

Main ingredients commonly include chicken, mutton, and lentils.

History

Mulligatawny was popular in India by the end of the 18th century, and by the 19th century it began to appear in cookbooks of the day, with each cook (or cookbook) featuring its own recipe. Recipes for mulligatawny varied greatly at that time and over the years (e.g., Maria Rundell's A New System of Domestic Cookery contained three versions), and later versions of the soup included British modifications that included meat, although the local Madras (modern Chennai) recipe on which it was based did not. Early references to it in English go back to 1784. In 1827, William Kitchiner wrote that it had become fashionable in Britain:

By the mid-1800s, Arthur Robert Kenney-Herbert (1840–1916), under the pen name Wyvern, wrote in his popular Culinary Jottings that "really well-made mulligatunny is ... a thing of the past." He also noted that this simple recipe prepared by poorer natives of Madras as made by "Mootoosamy" was made by pounding:

Ingredients 
According to the Oxford Companion to Food, the simplest version of the soup included chicken or mutton, fried onion, and spices. More complex versions may call for "a score of ingredients". Versions originating in southern India commonly called for lentils.

Popular culture
The dish features in the sketch Dinner for One which is 
broadcast every New Year's Eve in Scandinavia and Germany.

See also
List of soups

Footnotes

References

English soups
Indian soups and stews
Indian cuisine in the United Kingdom
Tamil cuisine
Anglo-Indian cuisine
Curry dishes